Danish film director Simon Staho (born 1972) has worked with a number of renowned Swedish actors, including Mikael Persbrandt, Noomi Rapace, Pernilla August and Erland Josephson.

Staho’s first feature film Vildspor/Wildside (1998) was shot in Iceland and starred Mads Mikkelsen and Nikolaj Coster-Waldau. It was selected for the San Sebastian International Film Festival. Variety wrote in its review: “A solidly crafted thriller with links to classic film noir, though the bleakly beautiful Icelandic settings invest this tale of friendship and betrayal with a distinct ambience. Intelligent and suspenseful fare.”

In 2002, Staho directed Nu/Now, a short film about a man whose marriage is destroyed when he has a secret homosexual relationship. The film - shot in black and white - stars Mads Mikkelsen and Mikael Persbrandt as the male lovers.

With a cast of Swedish actors, Staho directed Dag och Natt/Day and Night (2004), also selected for San Sebastian and winner of the Silver Hugo Award at the Chicago International Film Festival.

Variety wrote in its review: “Set entirely within a car with a two-camera set-up, “Day and Night” is one of the most interesting films to have been made in Sweden for a long while. The drama is about the last day in the life of a man at the end of his rope. The film starts with a voice-over, telling the audience that on 11 September 2003, a man named Thomas committed suicide by shooting himself in the head. The rest of the movie depicts the day leading up to this act, with Thomas (Mikael Persbrandt, in a career-defining role) meeting for the last time various people who in some way or another have meant something to him and in his life.”

Bang Bang Orangutang (2005), selected for the main competition at the San Sebastian International Film Festival, is a tragic-comic story about the humiliations of a power-drunk businessman trying to pick up the pieces of his destroyed life, after he has killed his youngest son in a car accident.

In Daisy Diamond (2007), also selected for the main competition at the San Sebastian International Film Festival, Staho returned to a mostly Danish cast. The story deals with Anna (played by Noomi Rapace), who dreams of making it as an actress. When she becomes pregnant, her struggle to give her baby a good start in life culminates in a desperate act that has fatal consequences.

Noomi Rapace won the two top film awards in Denmark (the Bodil and Robert prize) for Best Actress for her role in Daisy Diamond. According to Variety, “Rapace delivers a superbly committed performance in a demanding role, the actress having to expose herself physically and emotionally.”

In 2008, Staho directed Himlens Hjärta/Heaven's Heart, selected for the Berlin International Film Festival. A four character chamber drama that details a marital breakup, the story focuses on two middle-aged married couples as they confront their adulterous impulses.

Variety praised Heaven’s Heart as “An intense film with an all-star cast. Raw emotion, fearless performances and stylized cinematography mark the film as prime festival fare. Compelling viewing.” Actress Maria Lundqvist won Best Supporting Actress at the Swedish film awards, the ‘Guldbagges'.

Kärlekens Krigare/Warriors of Love (2009) - shot in black and white - centers on a lesbian couple whose relationship is threatened by a long-buried secret: Ida’s father sexually abused her as a child, and serious emotional scars remain. The film premiered at the Locarno International Film Festival.

In 2011, Staho directed the musical Magi i Luften/Love Is In The Air about the adventures of four teenagers during one single night. The film was selected for the Berlin International Film Competition 2012.

In its review, Screendaily wrote: "Simon Staho, the Danish director who has made a name for himself with intense, brooding dramas, takes a turn in a startling new direction with Love Is In The Air, a pop musical about horny teens that is brash, abrasive and raunchy."

Miraklet/The Miracle - starring Ulrich Thomsen, Sonja Richter and Peter Plaugborg - premiered in 2013 at the Montreal International Film Festival, where it won the Best Actor award. It was also selected for the Main Competition at the Chicago International Film Festival.

In 2014, Simon Staho directed Jørgen Leth - Fem Undersøgelser/Jørgen Leth - Five Studies about the Danish poet and filmmaker Jørgen Leth. In the film, Staho dives into Leth's collected works, frame-by-frame, line-by-line, collaging film clips with poems and revisiting more than 50 years of Leth's poetry and film.

Jørgen Leth - Fem Undersøgelser/Jørgen Leth - Five Studies consists of five films: Andy Warhol Eats A Burger (112 min.), The White Man (7 min.), Black Snow (10 min.), I Destroy You With My Machine (15 min.) and What There Is (7 min.) The films premiered at gallery Andersen's Contemporary, Copenhagen in Autumn 2014.

Also in 2014, Staho directed the stage play Hjertet Skælver/The Heart Trembles at Denmark's largest regional theatre, Aarhus Theatre. The play was written by Danish playwright Peter Asmussen, who has written several screenplays with Staho.

In 2015, Staho directed the stage play "Det Der eR/DDR" at Husets Teater in Copenhagen. The text was written by playwright Peter Asmussen.

Simon Staho was recipient of the Ingmar Bergman Travel Grant in 2008. In 2012 Staho was awarded the three-year working grant from the Danish Arts Council.

Simon Staho's films have been shown at a.o.:

Guggenheim Museum Bilbao; Berlin International Film Festival; San Sebastian International Film Festival; Chicago International Film Festival; Moscow International Film Festival; Jerusalem International Film Festival; Montreal World Film Festival; Locarno International Film Festival; Mexico City International Contemporary Film Festival; Stockholm International Film Festival; Miami International Film Festival;  
Taipei Film Festival; Havana International Film Festival; Istanbul International Film Festival; Buenos Aires Festival de Cine Independiente; Hamburg FilmFest; Denver International Film Festival; Milan MIFED; Puerto Rico International Film Festival; Helsinki Film Festival; Santiago Film Festival; Flanders International Film Festival Ghent; Bogota International Film Festival; Mumbai International Film Festival; Lecce European Cinema Festival; Norwegian International Film Festival; Mar del Plata International Film Festival; Vilnius International Film Festival; Mannheim-Heidelberg International Film Festival; Molodist International Film Festival; Göteborg International Film Festival; Bratislava International Film Festival; Hyderabad International Film Festival; Tallinn Black Nights Film Festival; Oporto International Film Festival; Oslo International Film Festival; Transilvania International Film Festival; Santo Domingo International Film Festival; Troia International Film Festival; Motovun Film Festival; Ciné Nordica, Paris et al.

Filmography

1998 - Vildspor (a.k.a. Wildside) 
2002 - Nu (a.k.a. Now)
2004 - Dag och natt (a.k.a. Day and Night)
2005 - Bang Bang Orangutang
2007 - Daisy Diamond
2008 - Himlens Hjärta (a.k.a. Heaven's Heart)
2009 - Kärlekens Krigare (a.k.a. Warriors of Love)
2011 - Magi i Luften (a.k.a. Love Is In The Air)
2013 - Miraklet (a.k.a. The Miracle)
2014 - Jørgen Leth - Fem Undersøgelser (a.k.a. Jørgen Leth - Five Studies)

Theatre
2014 - Hjertet Skælver (a.k.a. The Heart Trembles), Aarhus Teater, Aarhus.
2015 - Det Der eR (a.k.a. DDR), Husets Teater, Copenhagen.

External links 
 Simon Staho - biography from The Danish Film Institute
 

Danish film directors
1972 births
Living people